Udawela Lekumlage Nalin Pradeep Udawela (born March 20, 1969 ), popularly as Nalin Pradeep Udawela, is an actor in Sri Lankan cinema, stage drama and television as well as a politician by profession. Highly versatile actor mostly engaged in theater and television, Udawela currently served as a Western Provincial Councilor.

Acting career
Udawela started his film career with Julietge Bhumikawa back in 1998, directed by Jackson Anthony. His most popular cinema acting came through films Tharaka Mal, Parawarthana and Asai Man Piyabanna.

Notable theater works
 Juriya
 Kelani Palama 
Mandela Mandela 
 Megha
 Modara Mola
 Mee Harak
 New Hunuwataye Kathawa
 Sewaneli Eda Minissu
 Suddek Oba Amathakai

Selected television serials

 Akuru Maki Na
 Aparna
 Api Apa Athara
 Baloli
 Batti
 Chakrandi
 Diya Ginisilu 
 Ehipillamak Yata  
 Eth Kanda Lihini
 Gang Dela Nisalai
 Hathwana Kandayama 
 Ira Awara
 Isuru Pawura 
 Kalu Kumari
 Kasee Salu 
 Kinduru Adaviya
 Kolam Kuttama
 Mahathala Hatana 
 Meeduma Wage Avidin
 Makulu Del
 Millewa Walawwa
 Minigandela
 Monaravila 
 Nisalawila
 Nonimi Yathra 
 Peramaga Salakunu 
 Piniwassa
 Pinsara Dosthara
 Prakampana
 Ran Mehesi 
 Ridee Ittankaraya 
 Sadgunakaraya
 Samanalayano
 Samanala Sihinaya 
 Sanda Dev Diyani 
 Sanda Hiru Tharu
 Sanda Nethi Lova
 Sihina Devduwa
 Siri Dev Bawana
 Sudu Hamine
 Suwanda Padma 
 Vasanthaya Avilla

Political career
In 2014, he contested for Western Province in provincial council election under Democratic Party led by Sarath Fonseka. Prior to the election, he was the organizer for Homagama area. He obtained 13,653 votes and selected 
as a councilor for Western provincial council.

In 2014, Udawela claimed that the President Mahinda Rajapaksa's government promised to pay Rs 50 million, to crossover to the ruling party. He further explained that, government assured that his entire family can provide citizenship in any country such as Canada, Australia or Netherlands.

Filmography

Awards and accolades
He has won several awards at the local stage drama, television and film festivals.

Sumathi Awards

|-
|| 1999 ||| Nisala Wila || Merit Award ||

Sarasaviya Awards

|-
|| 2007 ||| Tharaka Mal  Asai Man Piyabanna || Merit Award ||

References

External links
 Hybridisms, denials and the undeniable unfold
 Indigenous music spells progress

Sri Lankan male film actors
Sinhalese male actors
Living people
Sri Lankan male stage actors
1969 births
Sri Lankan actor-politicians